Diving Adventure is a 1970 children's book by the Canadian-born American author Willard Price featuring his "Adventure" series characters, Hal and Roger Hunt. It depicts their exploits in a futuristic underwater city.

1970 American novels
Novels by Willard Price
Underwater civilizations in fiction
Jonathan Cape books
Underwater novels
1970 children's books